Norman Guest ( – ) was a professional rugby league footballer who played in the 1930s, 1940s and 1950s.

Playing career

County honours
Norman Guest won a cap for Yorkshire while at Castleford, he played right-, i.e. number 3, in the 13-22 defeat by Lancashire at Warrington's stadium on Wednesday 5 October 1949.

County League appearances
Norman Guest played in Castleford's victory in the Yorkshire County League during the 1938–39 season.

Notable tour matches
Norman Guest played in Castleford's 3-17 defeat by New Zealand during the 1947–48 season at Wheldon Road, Castleford on Wednesday 8 October 1947.

Club career
Norman Guest made his début for Featherstone Rovers on Saturday 2 December 1939, he appears to have scored no drop-goals (or field-goals as they are currently known in Australasia), but prior to the 1974–75 season all goals, whether; conversions, penalties, or drop-goals, scored 2-points, consequently prior to this date drop-goals were often not explicitly documented, therefore '0' drop-goals may indicate drop-goals not recorded, rather than no drop-goals scored. In addition, prior to the 1949–50 season, the archaic field-goal was also still a valid means of scoring points.

Genealogical information
Norman Guest was the father of the rugby league footballer who played in the 1960s and 1970s for Castleford and Doncaster (Heritage № 339); Ian Guest.

References

External links
Search for "Guest" at rugbyleagueproject.org
Photograph "14 September 1946. Away v Leeds (Yorkshire Cup 1st Round 1st leg) won 8-11" at archive.castigersheritage.com
Photograph "8 October 1947. Home v New Zealand lost 3-17" at archive.castigersheritage.com
Photograph "14 Feb 48 Home v Wigan RLC Cup 1st Round 2nd Leg lost 7 - 19" (Colourised) at archive.castigersheritage.com
Photograph "14 Feb 48 Home v Wigan RLC Cup 1st Round 2nd Leg lost 7 - 19" (Black & White) at archive.castigersheritage.com
Photograph "19 February 1949. Away v Bramley RLC Cup 1st Round 2nd Leg won 2-10" at archive.castigersheritage.com
Photograph "10 September 1949. Home v Hull Yorkshire Cup 1st Round 1st Leg won 12-8" at archive.castigersheritage.com
Photograph "14 September 1949. Away v Hull Yorkshire Cup Round 1 2nd leg draw 13-13" at archive.castigersheritage.com
Photograph "17 September 1949. Home v York won 15-8" at archive.castigersheritage.com
Photograph "1949 Rugby League Review magazine- The Lads of Castleford" at archive.castigersheritage.com
Photograph "1975 - players reunion" at archive.castigersheritage.com
Photograph "This photo of Norman Guest has been provided by his son Graham" at archive.castigersheritage.com
Search for "Norman Guest" at britishnewspaperarchive.co.uk

1920s births
2010 deaths
Barrow Raiders players
Batley Bulldogs players
Castleford Tigers players
Doncaster R.L.F.C. players
English rugby league players
Featherstone Rovers players
Place of birth missing
Place of death missing
Rugby league centres
Rugby league fullbacks
Yorkshire rugby league team players